Stray Arrows: A Collection of Favorites is the first compilation album released by the American rock band Chevelle on December 4, 2012. It includes remastered versions of several hit songs, along with a previously unreleased B-side entitled "Fizgig." The songs on the standard track listing (except for "Sleep Apnea", "The Meddler" and "Fizgig") all cracked the top 10 on the Billboard Mainstream Rock Tracks, with "Send the Pain Below", "Vitamin R (Leading Us Along)", "Face to the Floor" and "Hats Off to the Bull" all reaching the No. 1 spot.

The album was named Revolvers album of the week on December 10, 2012.

Track listing

Charts

Personnel
 Pete Loeffler – vocals, guitar
 Sam Loeffler – drums
 Dean Bernardini – bass

References

External links
 Stray Arrows on Last.fm

2012 compilation albums
Chevelle (band) compilation albums
Epic Records compilation albums
Alternative metal compilation albums
Hard rock compilation albums
Post-grunge compilation albums
Progressive rock compilation albums